U. nitida may refer to:
 Ulidia nitida, a picture-winged fly species
 Uropeltis nitida, a non-venomous shield tail snake species found in southern India

See also 
 Nitida (disambiguation)